The 2001 Los Angeles Dodgers season was the 112th for the franchise in Major League Baseball, and their 44th season in Los Angeles, California. It was the first season with Jim Tracy as manager, after serving as the bench coach the previous two seasons. 

On July 28, the Dodgers were 61–44, leading the NL West by 2 games ahead of the Arizona Diamondbacks; however, the Dodgers would fade and lose 32 of their last 57 games, finishing third in the National League West, and six games behind the eventual World Series champion Arizona. This was their last season to be broadcast by KTLA (5).

Shawn Green had his best season, hitting a Dodger-record 49 home runs and also setting L.A. records for extra-base hits (84) and total bases (358). Paul Lo Duca became the full-time catcher and led the team with a .320 batting average and Jeff Shaw became the Dodgers all-time leader in saves, with 129.

Offseason
 February 25, 2001: Acquired Marquis Grissom and Ruddy Lugo from the Milwaukee Brewers for Devon White
March 13, 2001: Scott Service was released by the Los Angeles Dodgers.
March 18, 2001: Acquired Gary Majewski, Andre Simpson and Orlando Rodriguez from the Chicago White Sox for Antonio Osuna and Carlos Ortega
March 28, 2001: Traded Mike Judd to the Tampa Bay Devil Rays for a player to be named later
March 28, 2001: Ramón Martínez was released by the Dodgers.

Regular season

Season standings

Record vs. opponents

Opening Day lineup

Notable transactions
April 1, 2001: Doug Linton was released.
July 13, 2001: Acquired McKay Christensen from the Chicago White Sox for Wade Parrish.
July 26, 2001: Acquired James Baldwin and cash from the Chicago White Sox for Jeff Barry, Gary Majewski and Onan Masaoka.
July 31, 2001: Acquired Terry Mulholland from the Pittsburgh Pirates for Adrian Burnside and Mike Fetters.
July 31, 2001: Acquired Mike Trombley from the Baltimore Orioles for Kris Foster and Gerónimo Gil.

Roster

Starting Pitchers stats
Note: G = Games pitched; GS = Games started; IP = Innings pitched; W/L = Wins/Losses; ERA = Earned run average; BB = Walks allowed; SO = Strikeouts; CG = Complete games

Relief Pitchers stats
Note: G = Games pitched; GS = Games started; IP = Innings pitched; W/L = Wins/Losses; ERA = Earned run average; BB = Walks allowed; SO = Strikeouts; SV = Saves

Batting Stats
Note: Pos = Position; G = Games played; AB = At bats; Avg. = Batting average; R = Runs scored; H = Hits; HR = Home runs; RBI = Runs batted in; SB = Stolen bases

2001 Awards
2001 Major League Baseball All-Star Game
Chan Ho Park reserve
Jeff Shaw reserve
NL Player of the Week
Gary Sheffield (April 9–15)

Farm system 

Teams in BOLD won League Championships

Major League Baseball Draft

The Dodgers selected 49 players in this draft. Of those, only three of them would eventually play Major League baseball. They lost their first round pick this year to the Atlanta Braves as a result of their signing free agent pitcher Andy Ashby. The second round pick was right-handed pitcher Billy Pilkington from Santiago High School in Garden Grove, California. He played four seasons in the minors and had a record of 30-21 and a 3.67 ERA in 19 games (17 starts) before he was released. This years draft class was so bad that only four players in the top 20 picks even reached AAA.

The only player that made the Majors for more than a cameo appearance was Edwin Jackson, selected in the sixth round as an outfielder out of Shaw High School in Columbus, Georgia. He was converted to a pitcher and made it to the Majors in 2003 with the Dodgers and was then traded in 2006. He was a 2009 All-Star with the Detroit Tigers and also pitched a no-hitter in 2010 while a member of the Arizona Diamondbacks.

References

External links 
2001 Los Angeles Dodgers uniform
Los Angeles Dodgers official web site 
Baseball-Reference season page
Baseball Almanac season page

Los Angeles Dodgers seasons
Los Angeles Dodgers